Klawock is a city in Prince of Wales–Hyder Census Area, in the U.S. state of Alaska, on the west coast of Prince of Wales Island, on Klawock Inlet, across from Klawock Island. The population was 755 at the 2010 census, down from 854 in 2000.

History
Klawock's first settlers were Tlingit who came from the northern winter village of Tuxekan. They used it as a fishing camp for the summer period, and called it by several different names: Klawerak, Tlevak, Clevak, and Klawak. The name "Klawock" is derived from the Tlingit name , the man who founded the community. In 1853 a Russian navigator referred to the village as "Klyakkhan", and in 1855 as "Thlewakh".

In 1868, European Americans opened a trading post and a salmon saltery; some years later, in 1878, a San Francisco firm opened the first cannery in Alaska. In the following decades, several others were established. A United States post office was established in 1882. The 1890 census recorded the town's population as 260.

The Alaska Native Brotherhood (ANB) and Alaska Native Sisterhood (ANS), nonprofit organizations working for civil rights of Alaska Natives, were established by residents in 1912. Its founders and many volunteers built the Town Hall and a community center in 1939, during the Great Depression.

In 1929 the town was incorporated as a city, and in 1934 Congress awarded federal funding for the expansion of the cannery, on the condition that the community remains liquor-free. At the same time, the Klawock Cooperative Association (a nonprofit organization) was formed to manage the cannery.

Geography

Climate
Klawock has a warm summer oceanic climate.

Demographics

Klawock first appeared on the 1880 U.S. Census as the unincorporated Tlingit village of "Klawak." It continued to report as Klawak in 1890–1910, with the alternative spelling of "Klawock" first appearing in the latter census. In 1920, it was reported exclusively as Klawock. In 1929, it was officially incorporated.

As of the census of 2000, there were 854 people, 313 households, and 215 families residing in the city. The racial makeup of the city was 40.98% White, 50.94% Native American, 0.47% Asian, 0.12% Pacific Islander, 0.12% from other races, and 7.38% from two or more races.  1.41% of the population were Hispanic or Latino of any race.

There were 313 households, out of which 36.1% had children under the age of 18 living with them, 49.2% were married couples living together, 10.2% had a female householder with no husband present, and 31.0% were non-families. 25.9% of all households were made up of individuals, and 3.8% had someone living alone who was 65 years of age or older.  The average household size was 2.73 and the average family size was 3.25.

In the city, the age distribution of the population shows 30.1% under the age of 18, 7.4% from 18 to 24, 29.9% from 25 to 44, 26.1% from 45 to 64, and 6.6% who were 65 years of age or older.  The median age was 34 years. For every 100 females, there were 124.1 males.  For every 100 females age 18 and over, there were 134.1 males.

The median income for a household in the city was $35,000, and the median income for a family was $38,839. Males had a median income of $38,977 versus $23,036 for females. The per capita income for the city was $14,621.  About 13.6% of families and 14.3% of the population were below the poverty line, including 16.5% of those under age 18 and 5.0% of those age 65 or over.

Tourism
Klawock has the oldest hatchery in Alaska. This industry enhances the runs of salmon, including sockeye, coho, and steelhead. A sawmill and area logging operations are located here.

Klawock has a harbor, often used by tourists as a departure point for trips or boating exploration of the bays, inlets, and surrounding islands.

Each February 16, the ANB/ANS organizations sponsor the "Elizabeth Peratrovich Celebration" with ceremonies and a potluck, honoring the anniversary of the passage of the landmark legislation. The city also sponsors a summer festival, the "Celebration by the Sea."

A Totem Park has 21 totem poles, one of the largest collections in Alaska: it displays original and replica totems from the old village of Tuxekan. The city built a carving shed to house the poles during restoration, which can be visited. In 1998 the city commissioned the construction of a Long House (named Gaanì Ax Adi) with a new totem pole.

Law and government
There is a mayor and a council, but the city is not located in any borough. The local government manages the water, wastewater, refuse collection, trailer court, landfill, boat harbor, liquor store, and boat ramp utilities. There is a local sales tax of 5.5%, of which 0.5% is devoted to education, and no property tax.

There are four full-time police officers. There is also a volunteer fire department with 27 members, an EMS squad of 6-8 trained volunteers, and a search and rescue office (serving all of Prince of Wales Island) with 57 members.

Education
There is a school with grades K-6 and a high school with grades 7-12 both administered by the Klawock City School District. On average, 200 students are enrolled yearly. The Head Start school (three- to four-year-olds) is run by the Tlingit and Haida Central Council.

Transportation

Airport
The 5,000 foot and paved Klawock Airport is the only airport on Prince of Wales Island and serves as the air transport gateway for nearby Craig as well. It receives charters and daily scheduled passenger service from Ketchikan from Island Air Express.  Alaska Seaplanes provides flights from Juneau and Sitka.

Ferry
Ferry service is available through the Inter-Island Ferry Authority from either Prince of Wales Island communities of Hollis (M/V Prince of Wales, with service to Ketchikan) or Coffman Cove (M/V Stikine, with service to Wrangell or Petersburg) which are both accessible through Prince of Wales' road system.

Notable people
 Frank Peratrovich (1895–1984), then-mayor of Klawock and later president of the ANB, became one of the 55 delegates to the Alaska Constitutional Convention in 1955
 Elizabeth Peratrovich (1911–1958), sister-in-law of Frank, president of the Alaska Native Sisterhood (ANS), worked in the 1940s on anti-discrimination legislation.  She is credited with gaining Senate approval in 1945 due to her passionate testimony about the effects of discrimination. The state has recognized her contribution, naming February 16 and Gallery B of the State Capitol in her honor

References

External links

 
Klawock Totem Park at The Living New Deal Project

Cities in Alaska
Cities in Prince of Wales–Hyder Census Area, Alaska
Haida villages
Populated coastal places in Alaska on the Pacific Ocean